Mirta Rodríguez Calderón is Cuban journalist based in Santo Domingo, Dominican Republic. She is known for her advocacy of feminist journalism and gender equality in media. She co-founded the International Network of Journalists With a Gender Perspective in 2005, and is a promoter of alliances among journalists in Ecuador, the Dominican Republic, and Cuba, with the aim of including gender-based approaches in social communication.

Career
Educated in Havana, Mirta Rodríguez Calderón first moved to Mexico, and in the late 1990s she moved to the Dominican Republic as a correspondent for Servicio de Noticias de la Mujer de Latinoamérica y el Caribe (SEMlac).

She was a clandestine operative against the dictatorships of Gerardo Machado and Fulgencio Batista with the Martí Women's Civic Front, for which she received recognition from the José Martí Cultural Society of Havana. She later wrote:

In Cuba, she was co-founder of the Association of Women Communicators (MAGIN), and taught communications at the Pontifical Catholic University of Santo Domingo.

She was editor of the Journal of Communication and A Primera Plana, a newspaper dedicated to promoting equality between men and women in the media.

She is especially known for her coverage of the 2010 Haiti earthquake, which won the 2011 Mary Fran Myers Award. She has worked with the Women and Health Collective, and with CEMUJER, a grassroots women's organization in Santo Domingo.

Awards and recognition
 2011 May Fran Myers Award for her journalistic work on gender and natural disasters
 Recognition of the José Martí Cultural Society of Havana

Publications
 Tania, the Unforgettable Guerrilla (1971), cowritten with Marta Rojas, 
 Hablar sobre el hablar (1985), Editorial de Ciencias Sociales
 Dígame usted! (1989), Editorial Pablo de la Torriente
 Semillas de fuego: compilación sobre la lucha clandestina en la capital, Volume 1 (1989), collective work

Articles
 "No nos han dejado salir de las guardarrayas" (2001)
 "Belén do Pará: La Convención que lo dijo casi todo y ha logrado poco" (2012), news and reports for SEMlac
 "Dominicana: Ciudadanía plena y democracia, objetivos de mujeres latinoamericanas" (2012), news and reports for SEMlac
 "Dominicana: Diputadas concertan agendas de género para próximo gobierno" (2012), news and reports for SEMlac
 "Dominicana: Elegirá la población nuevo presidente en comicios conflictivos" (2012)
 "Dominicana: Protestas en la calle por mujeres agredidas y asesinadas" (2012), news and reports for SEMlac
 "Julieta Paredes: Un feminismo que cree en las utopías y la comunidad" (2012)
 "República Dominicana: Aluvión de protestas y manifestaciones" (2012)
 "República Dominicana: Revisión de acuerdos de El Cairo: ¿más de lo mismo?" (2012)
 "Dominicana: Otra niña embarazada puede morir" (2013)
 "Dominicana: Romper cadenas bailando para rechazar la violencia" (2013), news and reports for SEMlac
 "Dominicanas: Mujeres vuelven a enfrentarse al Congreso por Código Penal" (2013)
 "República Dominicana: Matrimonio homosexual se abre paso" (2013)

References

External links
  

Cuban feminists
Cuban journalists
Cuban women journalists
Feminist writers
Living people
Year of birth missing (living people)